Nationality words link to articles with information on the nation's poetry or literature (for instance, Irish or France).

Events

 January – The Ogura Hyakunin Isshu Cultural Foundation, founded by the Kyoto, Japan, Chamber of Commerce and Industry, opens the Ogura Hyakunin Isshu Hall of Fame, dedicated to the anthology of 100 poems by 100 poets compiled by Fujiwara no Teika in c. 1235. The popularity of the anthology endures, and a Japanese card game, Uta-garuta, uses cards with the poems printed on it.
 March 29 – The Grolier Poetry Bookshop in Cambridge, Massachusetts, is sold.
 May – The Poetry Out Loud recitation contest is created this year by the National Endowment for the Arts and The Poetry Foundation in the United States to increase awareness in the art of performing poetry, with a top prize a $20,000 scholarship. State finalists perform in Washington, D.C. during the second week of the month.
 July 14
 Kazakh poet Aron Atabek is arrested after riot police and bulldozers arrive at the shanty town of Shanyrak, Kazakhstan for its demolition. Atabek is sentenced to 18 years in prison for alleged offences relating to the clash this day between protesters and police.
 The Times Literary Supplement reports on the discovery of a missing copy of Shelley's Poetical Essay on the Existing State of Things, an 1811 pamphlet containing a 172-line poem which criticizes war, politics and religion; although published anonymously, the poem is thought to have contributed to the rebel poet's expulsion from the University of Oxford (which acquires the unique copy of the pamphlet in 2015).
 August 15 – The existence of two early poems by Ted Hughes, written into a school exercise book, is announced; one an early version of "Song" which appeared in his first collection.
 November 1 – A Sylvia Plath sonnet from her college years is discovered and first published by Blackbird, an online literary journal run by the English Department at Virginia Commonwealth University in Richmond, Virginia.
 November 10 – A new series, "The Best of Irish Poetry" is launched by Southword Editions in Ireland with the 80-page The Best of Irish Poetry 2007 The project is under the direction of Patrick Cotter, with Colm Breathnach as Irish-language editor and Maurice Riordan as English-language (or Hiberno-English) editor. "Quite often readers abroad are presented with a selection of Irish poets restricted to those who are first published in the USA or the UK," Cotter wrote. "This annual series will present a more general selection generated by more informed pundits."
 November – The most influential American poets of all time are Walt Whitman, T. S. Eliot, William Carlos Williams, Wallace Stevens and Sylvia Plath, according to Christian Wiman, editor of Poetry magazine. Wiman names the poets in a sidebar article to a December The Atlantic Monthly cover story about the "100 Most Influential Americans" — no poet makes it on that larger list.
 French public notary Patrick Huet unveils Pieces of Hope to the Echo of the World in Lyon. It is reportedly the longest modern hand-written poem in the world.
 BLATT, an English-language literary magazine and publishing imprint is started in Prague, Czech Republic.
 Pakistani poet Ahmed Faraz, who writes in Urdu, returns one of his country's highest civilian honors, the Hilal-e-Imtiaz, out of disgust with President Pervez Musharraf's government. The prize had been awarded to the poet in 2004 for his literary achievements. "My conscience will not forgive me if I remained a silent spectator of the sad happenings around us", he said. "The least I can do is to let the dictatorship know where it stands in the eyes of the concerned citizens, whose fundamental rights have been usurped."

Works published in English
Listed by nation where the work was first published and again by the poet's native land, if different; substantially revised works listed separately:

Australia
See also 2006 in Australian literature
 Robert Adamson The Goldfinches of Baghdad
 Ken Babstock, Airstream Land Yacht (Black Inc.), 
 Laurie Duggan, The Passenger, winner of the 2007 Arts Queensland Judith Wright Calanthe Award; St. Lucia: University of Queensland Press
 Stephen Edgar, Other Summers, 108 pp; named a "Book of the Year" by The Age; Melbourne: Black Pepper, 
 Robert Gray, Nameless Earth
 Jennifer Harrison: Folly & Grief (Black Pepper) 
 Dennis Haskell, All the Time in the World
 Judy Johnson, Jack
 S. K. Kelen, Earthly Delights
 Chris Mansell, Love poems (Kardoorair, Armidale)
 Graeme Miles, Phosphorescence
 Les Murray, The Biplane Houses
 Dorothy Porter, The Best Australian Poems 2006 (Black, Inc.), 
 Mark Reid, A Difficult Faith
 Thomas Shapcott, The City of Empty Rooms
 Craig Sherborne, Necessary Evil, Black Inc., 
 John Tranter, Urban Myths: 210 Poems
 rob walker, "micromacro" 
 Chris Wallace-Crabbe, Then
 Simon West, First Names
 Fay Zwicky, Picnic

Canada
 Margaret Avison, Momentary Dark
 Elizabeth Bachinsky, Home of Sudden Service
 Ven Begamudré, The Lightness Which Is Our World, Seen from Afar
 Earle Birney, One Muddy Hand: Selected Poems, Sam Solecki ed. Posthumous.
 Dionne Brand, Inventory
 George Elliott Clarke, Black, Vancouver: Polestar, 
 Wayne Clifford, The Book of Were
 Leonard Cohen, Book of Longing
 Jon Paul Fiorentino, The Theory of the Loser Class (Coach House Books) 
 Maxine Gadd, Backup to Babylon
 Matthew Holmes, Hitch, a first volume
 Anita Lahey, Out to Dry in Cape Breton
 Elizabeth Mayne, A Passionate Continuity
 Don McKay:
 Strike/Slip winner of the 2007 Canadian Griffin Poetry Prize and the Dorothy Livesay Poetry Prize
 Field Marks: The Poetry of Don McKay edited by Méira Cook
 Garry Thomas Morse, Transversals for Orpheus
 Michael Ondaatje, The Story, Toronto: House of Anansi, 
 P. K. Page, Hand Luggage: A Memoir in Verse
 Sina Queyras, Lemon Hound (Coach House Books) 
 Angela Rawlings, Wide Slumber for Lepidopterists (Coach House Books) 
 Raymond Souster:
 Down to Earth Battered Silicon Dispatch Box.
 Wondrous Wobbly World: Poems for the New Millennium.
 Uptown Downtown Battered Silicon Dispatch Box.
 Nathalie Stephens, Touch to Affliction (Coach House Books) 
 Sharon Thesen, The Good Bacteria

India, in English
 Keki Daruwalla, Collected poems, 1970–2005 ( Poetry in English ), New Delhi and New York City : Penguin Books
 Anjum Hasan, Street on the Hill ( Poetry in English ), New Delhi : Sahitya Akademi.
 Meena Kandasamy, Touch ( Poetry in English ), Mumbai : Peacock Books
 Suniti Namjoshi, Sycorax: New Fables and Poems ( Poetry in English ), Penguin India, New Delhi, 2006. 
 Robin Ngangom, The Desire of Roots( Poetry in English ), Cuttack : Chandrabhaga
 E.V. Ramakrishnan, Terms of Seeing: New and Selected Poems, ( Poetry in English ), New Delhi: Konark Publishers,
 Udaya Narayana Singh, Second Person Singular, translated from the original Maithili of the author's Madhyampurush Ekvachan by the author and Rizio Yohanan Raj; New Delhi : Katha

Ireland
 Vona Groarke, Juniper Street, Oldcastle: The Gallery Press, Ireland
 Seamus Heaney, District and Circle, Faber & Faber; Irish poet published in the United Kingdom
 Maurice Riordan and Colm Breathnach, editors, Best of Irish Poetry 2007 selections from 50 Irish poets, including Eavan Boland, Seamus Heaney, Thomas McCarthy, Paul Muldoon, Paul Durcan, Eamon Grennan, Vona Groarke, Thomas Kinsella, Michael Longley, Dorothy Molloy, Gerry Murphy, Katie Donovan, Matthew Sweeney, Derek Mahon, Gabriel Rosenstock, Louis De Paor, Nuala Ní Dhomhnaill (Southward Editions)  (anthology) Ireland (published November 2006)
 Justin Quinn, Waves and Trees, Oldcastle: The Gallery Press

New Zealand
 Airini Beautrais Secret Heart, Victoria University Press
 Glenn Colquhoun, Playing God
 Janet Frame, The Goose Bath, posthumous
 Bill Manhire, Lifted
 Cilla McQueen, A Wind Harp (compact disc)
 Alison Wong, Cup, Publisher: Steele Roberts

Poets in Best New Zealand Poems
Poems from these 25 poets were selected by John Newton for Best New Zealand Poems 2015, published online this year:

 Michele Amas
 Angela Andrews
 Stu Bagby
 Jenny Bornholdt
 James Brown

 Janet Charman
 Geoff Cochrane
 Mary Cresswell
 Wystan Curnow
 Stephanie de Montalk

 Fiona Farrell
 Bernadette Hall
 Anne Kennedy
 Michele Leggott
 Anna Livesey

 Karlo Mila
 James Norcliffe
 Gregory O'Brien
 Vivienne Plumb
 Anna Smaill

 Elizabeth Smither
 Robert Sullivan
 Brian Turner
 Ian Wedde
 Sonja Yelich

United Kingdom
 Carol Ann Duffy and Jane Ray, The Lost Happy Endings, Penguin
 James Fenton:
 Selected Poems (2006) Penguin
 Editor, The New Faber Book of Love Poems (anthology)
 John Haynes (poet), Letter to Patience, a book-length poem in iambic pentameter, in the form of a letter from a Nigerian father in Britain to his friend back in Nigeria; winner of the Costa Book Award
 Seamus Heaney, District and Circle, Faber & Faber; Irish poet published in the United Kingdom
 Allison Hedge Coke – Blood Run, Salt Publications
 Geoffrey Hill: Without Title
 Derek Mahon, Adaptations (A collection of versions, rather than translations proper, from poets such as Pasolini, Juvenal, Bertolt Brecht, Valery, Baudelaire, Rilke, and Nuala Ní Dhomhnaill.) Gallery Press
 Roger Moulson, Waiting for the Night-Rowers, Enitharmon Press, winner of the 2006 Jerwood Aldeburgh First Collection Prize
 Sean O'Brien, Inferno: a verse version of Dante's Inferno (Picador)
 Robin Robertson, Swithering, winner of the 2006 Forward Poetry Prize for Best Collection, shortlisted for the T.S. Eliot Prize
 Claire Tomalin, Thomas Hardy, Penguin Press, one of The New York Times "100 Notable Books of the Year" for 2007 (biography)
 Hugo Williams, Dear Room, (Faber and Faber)

Poets included in New Writing 14
This book of British writing (Granta), edited by Lavinia Greenlaw and Helon Habila, contains short stories, essays and excerpts of novels in addition to poems by these poets:

 Carrie Etter
 Iain Galbraith
 Chenjerai Hove
 Stephen Knight

 Frances Leviston
 Carola Luther
 Jamie McKendrick
 David Morley

 Paul Muldoon
 Blessing Musariri
 Sean O'Brien
 Don Paterson

 Paul Perry
 Greta Stoddart
 Eoghan Walls

United States
 A. R. Ammons, Selected Poems, American Poets Project of the Library of America; distributed by Penguin Putnam, posthumous
 Renée Ashley, The Museum of Lost Wings
 Bruce Beasley, The Corpse Flower: New and Selected Poems, University of Washington Press, 
 Robin Becker, Domain of Perfect Affection, Pittsburgh University Press
 Elizabeth Bishop, Edgar Allan Poe & The Juke-Box: Uncollected Poems, Drafts, and Fragments, Alice Quinn, editor (Farrar, Straus & Giroux), posthumous
 Charles Bukowski, Come On In!: New Poems (Ecco)
 Hayden Carruth, Toward the Distant Islands: New and Selected Poems, Copper Canyon Press, edited by Sam Hamill
 Jared Carter, Cross this Bridge at a Walk, Wind Publications.
 Carson Cistulli Some Common Weaknesses Illustrated, Casagrande Press.
 Hart Crane, Hart Crane: Complete Poems and Selected Letters, edited by Langdon Hammer, Library of America (posthumous)
 Robert Creeley, On Earth: Last Poems and an Essay (University of California Press)
 Dick Davis, Trick of Sunlight, Swallow Press
 Michael Dumanis and Cate Marvin, Editors, Legitimate Dangers: American Poets of the New Century (Sarabande Books)
 Daisy Fried, My Brother Is Getting Arrested Again (University of Pittsburgh Press), a finalist for the National Book Critics Circle Award for poetry
 Jack Gilbert, Tough Heaven: Poems of Pittsburgh, Transgressions: Selected Poems
 Allen Ginsberg, Collected Poems, 1947–1997 (posthumous), one of the New York Times "100 Notable Books of the Year", an expanded edition of the 1984 Collected Poems, 1947–1980
 Jesse Glass, The Passion of Phineas Gage and Selected Poems (West House/Ahadada)
 Eugene Gloria, Hoodlum Birds, Penguin
 Louise Glück, Averno (Farrar, Straus and Giroux), one of the New York Times "100 Notable Books of the Year"
 Linda Gregg, In the Middle Distance, Graywolf
 Donald Hall, White Apples and the Taste of Stone: Selected Poems 1946–2006 (Houghton Mifflin)
 Suheir Hammad, ZataarDiva, book and CD (Cypher/Rattapallax)
 Jim Harrison, Saving Daylight (Copper Canyon Press) 
 Seamus Heaney, District and Circle, Farrar Straus & Giroux
 Allison Hedge Coke – Blood Run, US edition
 George Heym, Poems (Northwestern University Press, translated from German by Antony Hasler
 Jeffrey Harrison, Incomplete Knowledge, Four Way Books
 Jane Hirshfield, After: Poems, (HarperCollins), named as one of the best books of the year by The Washington Post
 Paul Hoover, Edge and Fold (Apogee Press)
 Frieda Hughes, Forty-Five (HarperCollins)
 Troy Jollimore, Tom Thomson in Purgatory (MARGIE/Intuit House), winner of the National Book Critics Circle Award for poetry
 Patricia Spears Jones, Femme du Monde: Poems, (Tia Chucha Press)
 Mary Karr, Sinners Welcome: Poems (HarperCollins)
 Ariana-Sophia M. Kartsonis, Intaglio, Kent State
 Galway Kinnell, Strong Is Your Hold (Houghton Mifflin Books), the poet's first collection of new poems in more than a decade, one of the New York Times "100 Notable Books of the Year"
 Thomas Kinsella, Collected Poems: 1956–2001, Wake Forest
 Kei Miller, Kingdom of Empty Bellies, Jamaican poet published in the United States:
 Hannah Nijinsky and John Most, Persephone (AQP Collective)
 Alice Notley, Grave of Light: New and Selected Poems 1970–2005 (Wesleyan University Press)
 Mary Oliver, Thirst (Beacon Press)
 Carl Phillips, Riding Westward, New York: Farrar, Straus and Giroux
 George Quasha, Axial Stones: An Art of Precarious Balance, foreword Carter Ratcliff  (North Atlantic Books, Berkeley) [sculpture & poetry/preverbs]
 Ishmael Reed, New and Collected Poems, 1964–2006, one of the New York Times "100 Notable Books of the Year"
 Lisa Robertson, The Men: A Lyric Book (BookThug) 
 Theodore Roethke, Straw for the Fire: From the Notebooks of Theodore Roethke, compiled by David Wagoner from "277 spiral notebooks of poetry fragments, aphorisms, jokes, memos, journal entries, random phrases, bits of dialog, commentary, and fugitive miscellany", Copper Canyon Press,  (posthumous)
 Miltos Sachtouris, Poems (1945–1971), bilingual edition, Greek with English translation by Karen Emmerich (Archipelago Books), finalist for the National Book Critics Circle Award for poetry
 Frederick Seidel, Ooga-Booga, (Farrar, Straus & Giroux), a finalist for the National Book Critics Circle Award for poetry
 Julie Sheehan, Orient Point: Poems, (W.W. Norton & Co.)
 Patricia Smith, Teahouse of the Almighty: Poems, selected by Ed Sanders (Coffee House Press, 2006)
 W.D. Snodgrass, Not For Specialists, New and Selected Poems, (BOA Editions, Ltd.), a finalist for the National Book Critics Circle Award for Poetry
 Mark Strand, Man and Camel (Alfred A. Knopf) by a Canadian native long living in and published in the United States
 Rosmarie Waldrop, Splitting Image (Zasterle), Curves to the Apple (New Directions)
 Alicia E. Vasquez, 1719 Union St. (Wasteland Press)
 Eliot Weinberger, Muhammed, (Verso, W.W. Norton & Co.)
 Dara Wier, Remnants of Hannah, Wave Books
 C.K. Williams, Collected Poems
 George Witte, The Apparitioners, Three Rail Press
 Charles Wright, Scar Tissue, (Farrar, Straus and Giroux)
 Franz Wright, God's Silence (Alfred A. Knopf)
 Robert Wrigley, Earthly Meditations: New and Selected Poems, Penguin
 Louis Zukofsky, Selected Poems, American Poets Project of the Library of America, distributed by Penguin Putnam; posthumous
 Jesse Lee Kercheval, Film History As Train Wreck

Anthologies in the United States
 Harold Bloom and Jesse Zuba, editors, American Religious Poems: An Anthology, Library of America
 Michael Hofmann, editor, Twentieth-Century German Poetry: An Anthology (Farrar, Straus and Giroux)
 Joy Katz and Kevin Prufer, editors, Dark Horses: Poets on Overlooked Poems, 76 poems, each selected by a poet who was asked to provide an "unknown or underappreciated poem written by anyone, in any language, from any era", along with a brief essay by the selecting poet about the poem each chose; Illinois University Press
 Jeb Livingood, series editor; Eric Pankey, editor, Best New Poets 2006: 50 Poems from Emerging Writers, Samovar
 Anne Marie Hacht, Poetry for Students, Volume 23

Poets included in The Best American Poetry 2006
Poets included in The Best American Poetry 2006, edited by David Lehman, co-edited this year by Billy Collins:

 Kim Addonizio
 Dick Allen
 Craig Arnold
 John Ashbery
 Jesse Ball
 Krista Benjamin
 Ilya Bernstein
 Gaylord Brewer
 Tom Christopher
 Laura Cronk
 Carl Dennis
 Stephen Dobyns
 Denise Duhamel
 Stephen Dunn
 Beth Ann Fennelly

 Megan Gannon
 Amy Gerstler
 Sarah Gorham
 George Green
 Debora Greger
 Eamon Grennan
 Daniel Gutstein
 R. S. Gwynn
 Rachel Hadas
 Mark Halliday
 Jim Harrison
 Robert Hass
 Christian Hawkey
 Terrance Hayes
 Bob Hicok

 Katia Kapovich
 Laura Kasischke
 Joy Katz
 David Kirby
 Jennifer L. Knox
 Ron Koertge
 John Koethe
 Mark Kraushaar
 Julie Larios
 Dorianne Laux
 Reb Livingston
 Thomas Lux
 Paul Muldoon
 Marilyn Nelson
 Richard Newman

 Mary Oliver
 Danielle Pafunda
 Mark Pawlak
 Bao Phi
 Donald Platt
 Lawrence Raab
 Betsy Retallack
 Liz Rosenberg
 J. Allyn Rosser
 Kay Ryan
 Mary Jo Salter
 Vejay Sheshadri
 Alan Shapiro
 Charles Simic
 Gerald Stern

 James Tate
 Sue Ellen Thompson
 Tony Towle
 Alison Townsend
 Paul Violi
 Ellen Bryant Voigt
 David Wagoner
 Charles Harper Webb
 C. K. Williams
 Terence Winch
 Susan Wood
 Franz Wright
 Robert Wrigley
 David Yezzi
 Dean Young

Criticism, scholarship and biography in the United States
 Jason Shinder, editor, “The Poem That Changed America: 'Howl' Fifty Years Later, essays on Allen Ginsberg's poem, Farrar, Straus & Giroux

Other
 Chandrashekhar Bhattacharya, Tomake Ebong Tomake: Poems  (Manaswini Publication), Bangladesh
 Claude Esteban, Le Jour à peine écrit (1967–1992), Gallimard, France
 Mohit Kailashnath Misra, "Ponder Awhile"  (Booksurge Publishers)

Works published in other languages
Listed by nation where the work was first published and again by the poet's native land, if different; substantially revised works listed separately:

Czech Republic
 Michal Ajvaz, Padesát pět měst ("Fifty-five cities")
 Petr Král, Hm čili Míra omylu, 2006
 Michal Šanda, Kecanice ("Chew The Rag"), Prague: Protis, 
 Marie Šťastná, Akty ("Nudes"), Czech Republic
 Ivan Wernisch, Michal Šanda and Milan Ohnisko, Býkárna, Druhé město Brno,

French language

Canada
 Claude Beausoliel, Regarde, tu vois, Le Castor Astral

France
 Léopold Sédar Senghor, Œuvre poétique, éd. Le Seuil – Points.
 Jacques Roubaud, Cœurs, La Bibliothèque oulipienne n°155
 Jean Max Tixier, Les silences du passeur, publisher: Le Taillis pré
 Linda Maria Baros, La Maison en lames de rasoir (The House Made of Razor Blades), Cheyne éditeur

Germany
 Christoph Buchwald, general editor, and Norbert Hummelt, guest editor, Jahrbuch der Lyrik 2007 ("Poetry Yearbook 2007"), publisher: S. Fischer Verlag; anthology
 Hendrik Jackson. Dunkelströme ("Dark Current") Kookbooks, 72 pages, 
 Christoph Janacs, Unverwandt den Schatten ("Intently the Shadow"); St. Georgs Presse
 Christoph Ransmayr, Der fliegende Berg, a novel-poem Austria
 Monika Rinck, Ah, das Love-Ding ("Ah, the Love-Ding"), illustrated by Andreas Topfer, Kookbooks, 160 pages,

India
Listed in alphabetical order by first name:
 Amarjit Chandan, Annjall, Lokgeet, Chandigarh; Punjabi
 Bharat Majhi; Oriya:
 Murtikar Bhubaneswar: Pen In, Bhubaneswar
 Mahanagara Padya, Bhubaneswar: Pratchi Prakasani
 Jayanta Mahapatra, Samparka, Natuna Dilli: Sāhitya Akādemi; Bengali-language
 K. Satchidanandan, Malayalam:
 Satchidanandte Kavithakal, selected poems, 1965–2005
 Anantam ("Infinite")
 Onnaam Padham ("The First Lesson")
 K. Siva Reddy, Mithi Ka Pukar, translated into Hindi from the original Telugu by Narasa Reddy), Hyderabad: Milind Prakashan
 Kanaka Ha Ma, Arabi Kadalu, Sagara, Karnataka: Akshara Prakashana; Kannada
 Namdeo Dhasal, Tujhe Bot Dharoon Chalalo Ahe Mee; Marathi
 Nirendranath Chakravarti, Jyotsnaye Ekela, Kolkata: Ananda Publishers; Bengali
 Prem ke Roopak, New Delhi: Vani Prakashan, anthology, Hindi-language

Poland

 Marcin Baran, 
 Stanisław Barańczak, Wiersze zebrane, Krakow: a5
 Wojciech Bonowicz, Pełne morze
 Ewa Lipska, Drzazga, Krakow: Wydawnictwo literackie
 Czesław Miłosz, Wiersze ostatnie ("The Last Poems"), Kraków: Znak
 Marta Podgórnik, Dwa do jeden
 Tomasz Różycki, Kolonie ("Colonies"), 77 poems, 86 pp, Kraków: Znak, 
 Jarosław Marek Rymkiewicz, Do widzenia gawrony ("Good-bye, Rooks"), Warsaw: Sic!
 Marcin Świetlicki, Muzyka środka
 Eugeniusz Tkaczyszyn-Dycki, Poezja jako miejsce na ziemi. (1988–2003)
 Jan Twardowski, Kilka myśli o cierpieniu, przemijaniu i odejściu Poznan: Księgarnia Św. Wojciecha

Russia
 Yelena Fanaylova, Russkaya versiya ("The Russian Version")
 Lev Losev, biography of Joseph Brodsky, a friend of the author, Russia
 Alexander Mezhirov, Артиллерия бьёт по своим, Moscow: publisher: Zebra E
 Aleksey Tsvetkov, Shekspir otdykhaet ("Shakespeare at Rest")
 Dmitry Vodennikov, Chernovik ("Rough Draft")
 Igor Vishnevetsky, На запад солнца ("West of the Sun")
 Ivan Zhdanov, a book of selected works

Other languages
 Klaus Høeck, Heartland, publisher: Gyldendal; Denmark Denmark
 Duo Yo, Duo Yu shixuan ("Poems by Duo Yu"), China

Awards and honors

International
 Nobel Prize in Literature: Orhan Pamuk, Turkey
 Golden Wreath of Poetry: Nancy Morejón (Cuba)

Australia
 C. J. Dennis Prize for Poetry:
 Dinny O'Hearn Poetry Prize: Friendly Fire by Jennifer Maiden
 Kenneth Slessor Prize for Poetry:

Canada
 Archibald Lampman Award: Laura Farina, This Woman Alphabetical
 Atlantic Poetry Prize: Anne Compton, Processional
 Canadian Parliamentary Poet Laureate: John Steffler (until December 3, 2008)
 Governor General's Literary Awards: John Pass, Stumbling in the Bloom (English); Hélène Dorion, Ravir: les lieux (French)
 Gerald Lampert Award: Suzanne Buffam, Past Imperfect
 Griffin Poetry Prize (Canada): Sylvia Legris, Nerve Squall
 Griffin Poetry Prize (International, in the English Language): Kamau Brathwaite, Born to Slow Horses
 Pat Lowther Award: Sylvia Legris, Nerve Squall
 Prix Alain-Grandbois: Fernand Ouellette, L'Inoubliable
 Dorothy Livesay Poetry Prize: Meredith Quartermain, Vancouver Walking
 Prix Émile-Nelligan: Maude Smith Gagnon, Une tonne d'air

New Zealand
 Prime Minister's Awards for Literary Achievement:
 Montana New Zealand Book Awards
 Poetry: Bill Manhire, Lifted, Victoria University Press
 NZSA Jessie Mackay Best First Book Award for Poetry: Karlo Mila, Dream Fish Floating. Huia Publishers

United Kingdom
 Forward Poetry Prize Best Collection: Robin Robertson for Swithering.
 Forward Poetry Prize Best First Collection: Tishani Doshi, for Countries of the Body.
 Forward Poetry Prize Best Single Poem: Sean O'Brien, for "Fantasia on a Theme of James Wright".
 T. S. Eliot Prize (United Kingdom and Ireland):  Seamus Heaney, for District and Circle
 Costa Book Awards (formerly Whitbread Award) for poetry: John Haynes for Letter to Patience
 Queen's Gold Medal for Poetry: Fleur Adcock

United States
 Agnes Lynch Starrett Poetry Prize awarded to Nancy Krygowski for Velocity
 American Academy of Arts and Letters: poets Paul Auster and Frank Bidart elected to the Literature Department
 Andrés Montoya Poetry Prize awarded to Gabriel Gomez for The Outer Bands
 Poet Laureate Consultant in Poetry to the Library of Congress: Donald Hall appointed
 Poet Laureate of Virginia: Carolyn Kreiter-Foronda, two year appointment 2006 to 2008
 Crab Orchard Series in Poetry Open Competition Awards: Moira Linehan, If No Moon
 James Laughlin Award for poetry: Tracy K. Smith
 National Book Award for poetry: Nathaniel Mackey, Splay Anthem, New Directions
 Finalists: Louise Glück, Averno, Farrar, Straus & Giroux; H.L. Hix, Chromatic, Etruscan Press; Ben Lerner, Angle of Yaw, Copper Canyon Press; James McMichael, Capacity, Farrar, Straus & Giroux
 National Poetry Review Book Prize: Bryan Penberthy, Lucktown.
 Poets' Prize: Catherine Tufariello, Keeping My Name
 Pulitzer Prize for Poetry (United States): Claudia Emerson, Late Wife; and Poet Laureate of Virginia 2008 to 2010
 Robert Fitzgerald Prosody Award: John Hollander
 Ruth Lilly Poetry Prize: Richard Wilbur
 Whiting Awards: Sherwin Bitsui, Tyehimba Jess, Suji Kwock Kim
 Wallace Stevens Award: Michael Palmer
 Yale Series of Younger Poets Competition: Jessica Fisher, Frail-Craft; Judge: Louise Glück
 Fellowship of the Academy of American Poets: Carl Phillips

From the Poetry Society of America
 Frost Medal: Maxine Kumin
 Shelley Memorial Award: George Stanley (poet), Judges: Sonia Sanchez, Joshua Clover
 Writer Magazine/Emily Dickinson Award: Nicole Cooley, "The Anatomical Museum", Judge: Gerald Stern
 Cecil Hemley Memorial Award: Rusty Morrison, "Sky Clutches Any Strong Beat", Judge: Cal Bedient
 Lanan Literary Award for Poetry: Bruce Weigl
 Lyric Poetry Award: Alice Jones, "Valle D'Aosta", Judge: Toi Derricotte
 Lucille Medwick Memorial Award: Lynne Knight, "Recovery", Judge: Grace Schulman
 Finalists: Amy Dryansky, Somewhere Honey from Those Bees; J.C. Todd, What's Left;
 Finalists: John Isles, The Arcadia Negotiations; Wayne Miller, The Book of Props; Emily Rosko, Weather Inventions; Judge: Forrest Gander
 Louise Louis/Emily F. Bourne Student Poetry Award: Katherine Browning, "to discover the cartography of blankness", Judge: Prageeta Sharma
 George Bogin Memorial Award: Kevin Prufer
 Finalists: Susan Briante, Jill McDonough, Judge: Marie Howe
 Robert H. Winner Memorial Award: Daneen Wardrop, Archicembalo, Judge: Jean Valentine
 Norma Farber First Book Award: Cammy Thomas, Cathedral of Wish, Judge: Medbh McGuckian
 William Carlos Williams Award: Brenda Hillman, Pieces of Air in the Epic, Judge: Marjorie Welish
 Finalists: Ethan Paquin, The Violence (Ahsahta Press); Aaron Shurin, Involuntary Lyrics (Omnidawn Press)

From the Poetry Society of Virginia Student Poetry Contest

Other awards and honors
 Deutsche Akademie für Sprache und Dichtung (German Academy for Language and Literature) Georg Büchner Prize: Oskar Pastior
 Cervantes Prize (Spanish-language): Antonio Gamoneda (Spain)

Deaths
Birth years link to the corresponding "[year] in poetry" article:

See also

 Poetry
 List of poetry awards

References

 RPO – A Time-Line of Poetry in English "A Timeline of English Poetry" Web page of the Representative Poetry Online Web site, University of Toronto

2000s in poetry
Poetry